Litylenchus is a genus of nematodes belonging to the family Anguinidae.

This genus is found in North America and Japan.

Species:
 Litylenchus coprosma Zhao, Davies, Alexander & Riley, 2011 
 Litylenchus crenatae

References

Nematodes